

Elimination round

Postseason

Volley
UAA
UAAP Season 59
UAAP volleyball tournaments